Lodhran District , is a district in the province of Punjab, Pakistan, with the city of Lodhran as its capital. Located on the northern side of the River Sutlej, it is bounded to the north by the districts of Multan, Khanewal and Vehari, to the south by Bahawalpur, to the east lie the districts of Vehari and Bahawalpur; while district Multan lies on the western side.

Lodhran was split off as a separate district from Multan in 1991. It has the lowest Human Development Index of all districts in Punjab, and is among the thirty poorest districts in Pakistan. It is a well-known cotton-growing area.

Administrative divisions
Lodhran District is spread over an area of 1,790 square kilometres and is subdivided into three tehsils (Lodhran, Kahror Pakka and Dunyapur) which contain a total of 73 Union Councils:

Demographics
At the time of the 2017 census the district had a population of 1,699,693, of which 861,394 were males and 838,156 females. Rural population is 1,434,092 while the urban population is 265,601. The literacy rate was 49.88%. Muslims are almost the entire population with 99.76%.

At the time of the 2017 census, 74.23% of the population spoke Saraiki, 15.65% Punjabi and 9.03% Urdu as their first language.

The most widely spoken first language is Saraiki (%), which is used by the major indigenous social groups of the Joiya ,baloach, Awan, Arain, [Arya],Kanju, Uttera/Uttero, Ghallu, Bhutta, Lodhra, Metla, Chaner Syed, Qureshi, Tareen and Pathan. Additionally, Punjabi is spoken by about %, primarily by two groups: descendants of the aabaadkaar: settlers from elsewhere in Punjab who arrived in the first half of the 20th century to cultivate the canal colonies, as well as by Muhajirs from the Arain and Jat groups who migrated from the territories that became modern India at the time of Partition in 1947. The major Muhajir group, however, are Rajputs, also known as Rangarr, from the Haryana region, who are speakers of Haryanvi (also known as Rangri). The percentage of the district's population who declared Urdu as their language at the 1998 census was %; this includes these Haryanvi speakers as well as other, smaller, groups of Muhajirs such as the Mughal. Additionally, the nomadic Od are speakers of the Od language, while Pashto (0.2%) is spoken by Pashtuns.

Education
Lodhran has a total of 828 government schools out of which 59 percent (487 schools) are for girl students. The district has an enrolment of 146,345 in public sector schools.

Bahauddin Zakariya University (BZU) Campus has been ranked as the 8th top university of Pakistan by Higher Education Commission (HEC) in 2019 and is the 2nd largest University of Punjab.

References

 
Districts of Punjab, Pakistan